Logical positivism, later called logical empiricism, and both of which together are also known as neopositivism, is a movement whose central thesis was the verification principle (also known as the verifiability criterion of meaning). This theory of knowledge asserted that only statements verifiable through direct observation or logical proof are meaningful in terms of conveying truth value, information or factual content. Starting in the late 1920s, groups of philosophers, scientists, and mathematicians formed the Berlin Circle and the Vienna Circle, which, in these two cities, would propound the ideas of logical positivism.

Flourishing in several European centres through the 1930s, the movement sought to prevent confusion rooted in unclear language and unverifiable claims by converting philosophy into "scientific philosophy", which, according to the logical positivists, ought to share the bases and structures of empirical sciences' best examples, such as Albert Einstein's general theory of relativity. Despite its ambition to overhaul philosophy by studying and mimicking the extant conduct of empirical science, logical positivism became erroneously stereotyped as a movement to regulate the scientific process and to place strict standards on it.

After World War II, the movement shifted to a milder variant, logical empiricism, led mainly by Carl Hempel, who, during the rise of Nazism, had immigrated to the United States. In the ensuing years, the movement's central premises, still unresolved, were heavily criticised by leading philosophers, particularly Willard van Orman Quine and Karl Popper, and even, within the movement itself, by Hempel. The 1962 publication of Thomas Kuhn's landmark book The Structure of Scientific Revolutions dramatically shifted academic philosophy's focus. In 1967 philosopher John Passmore pronounced logical positivism "dead, or as dead as a philosophical movement ever becomes".

Origins
Logical positivists picked from Ludwig Wittgenstein's early philosophy of language the verifiability principle or criterion of meaningfulness.  As in Ernst Mach's phenomenalism, whereby the mind knows only actual or potential sensory experience, verificationists took all sciences' basic content to be only sensory experience.  And some influence came from Percy Bridgman's musings that others proclaimed as operationalism, whereby a physical theory is understood by what laboratory procedures scientists perform to test its predictions.  In verificationism, only the verifiable was scientific, and thus meaningful (or cognitively meaningful), whereas the unverifiable, being unscientific, were meaningless "pseudostatements" (just emotively meaningful).  Unscientific discourse, as in ethics and metaphysics, would be unfit for discourse by philosophers, newly tasked to organize knowledge, not develop new knowledge.

Definitions
Logical positivism is sometimes stereotyped as forbidding talk of unobservables, such as microscopic entities or such notions as causality and general principles, but that is an exaggeration.  Rather, most neopositivists viewed talk of unobservables as metaphorical or elliptical: direct observations phrased abstractly or indirectly.  So theoretical terms would garner meaning from observational terms via correspondence rules, and thereby theoretical laws would be reduced to empirical laws.  Via Bertrand Russell's logicism, reducing mathematics to logic, physics' mathematical formulas would be converted to symbolic logic.  Via Russell's logical atomism, ordinary language would break into discrete units of meaning.  Rational reconstruction, then, would convert ordinary statements into standardized equivalents, all networked and united by a logical syntax.  A scientific theory would be stated with its method of verification, whereby a logical calculus or empirical operation could verify its falsity or truth.

Development
In the late 1930s, logical positivists fled Germany and Austria for Britain and the United States.  By then, many had replaced Mach's phenomenalism with Otto Neurath's physicalism, whereby science's content is not actual or potential sensations, but instead is entities publicly observable. Rudolf Carnap, who had sparked logical positivism in the Vienna Circle, had sought to replace verification with simply confirmation.  With World War II's close in 1945, logical positivism became milder, logical empiricism, led largely by Carl Hempel, in America, who expounded the covering law model of scientific explanation.  Logical positivism became a major underpinning of analytic philosophy, and dominated philosophy in the English-speaking world, including philosophy of science, while influencing sciences, but especially social sciences, into the 1960s.  Yet the movement failed to resolve its central problems, and its doctrines were increasingly criticized, most trenchantly by Willard Van Orman Quine, Norwood Hanson, Karl Popper, Thomas Kuhn, and Carl Hempel.

Roots

Language

Tractatus Logico-Philosophicus, by the young Ludwig Wittgenstein, introduced the view of philosophy as "critique of language", offering the possibility of a theoretically principled distinction of intelligible versus nonsensical discourse.  Tractatus adhered to a correspondence theory of truth (versus a coherence theory of truth).  Wittgenstein's influence also shows in some versions of the verifiability principle. In tractarian doctrine, truths of logic are tautologies, a view widely accepted by logical positivists who were also influenced by Wittgenstein's interpretation of probability although, according to Neurath, some logical positivists found Tractatus to contain too much metaphysics.

Logicism

Gottlob Frege began the program of reducing mathematics to logic, continued it with Bertrand Russell, but lost interest in this logicism, and Russell continued it with Alfred North Whitehead in their Principia Mathematica, inspiring some of the more mathematical logical positivists, such as Hans Hahn and Rudolf Carnap. Carnap's early anti-metaphysical works employed Russell's theory of types. Carnap envisioned a universal language that could reconstruct mathematics and thereby encode physics. Yet Kurt Gödel's incompleteness theorem showed this impossible except in trivial cases, and Alfred Tarski's undefinability theorem shattered all hopes of reducing mathematics to logic. Thus, a universal language failed to stem from Carnap's 1934 work Logische Syntax der Sprache (Logical Syntax of Language). Still, some logical positivists, including Carl Hempel, continued support of logicism.

Empiricism

In Germany, Hegelian metaphysics was a dominant movement, and Hegelian successors such as F H Bradley explained reality by postulating metaphysical entities lacking empirical basis, drawing reaction in the form of positivism. Starting in the late 19th century, there was a "back to Kant" movement.  Ernst Mach's positivism and phenomenalism were a major influence.

Origins

Vienna

The Vienna Circle, gathering around University of Vienna and Café Central, was led principally by Moritz Schlick.  Schlick had held a neo-Kantian position, but later converted, via Carnap's 1928 book Der logische Aufbau der Welt, that is, The Logical Structure of the World.  A 1929 pamphlet written by Otto Neurath, Hans Hahn, and Rudolf Carnap summarized the Vienna Circle's positions.  Another member of Vienna Circle to later prove very influential was Carl Hempel.  A friendly but tenacious critic of the Circle was Karl Popper, whom Neurath nicknamed the "Official Opposition".

Carnap and other Vienna Circle members, including Hahn and Neurath, saw need for a weaker criterion of meaningfulness than verifiability. A radical "left" wing—led by Neurath and Carnap—began the program of "liberalization of empiricism", and they also emphasized fallibilism and pragmatics, which latter Carnap even suggested as empiricism's basis. A conservative "right" wing—led by Schlick and Waismann—rejected both the liberalization of empiricism and the epistemological nonfoundationalism of a move from phenomenalism to physicalism. As Neurath and somewhat Carnap posed science toward social reform, the split in Vienna Circle also reflected political views.

Berlin

The Berlin Circle was led principally by Hans Reichenbach.

Rivals

Both Moritz Schlick and Rudolf Carnap had been influenced by and sought to define logical positivism versus the neo-Kantianism of Ernst Cassirer—the then leading figure of Marburg school, so called—and against Edmund Husserl's phenomenology.  Logical positivists especially opposed Martin Heidegger's obscure metaphysics, the epitome of what logical positivism rejected.  In the early 1930s, Carnap debated Heidegger over "metaphysical pseudosentences". Despite its revolutionary aims, logical positivism was but one view among many vying within Europe, and logical positivists initially spoke their language.

Export

As the movement's first emissary to the New World, Moritz Schlick visited Stanford University in 1929, yet otherwise remained in Vienna and was murdered in 1936 at the University by a former student, Johann Nelböck, who was reportedly deranged. That year, a British attendee at some Vienna Circle meetings since 1933, A. J. Ayer saw his Language, Truth and Logic, written in English, import logical positivism to the English-speaking world.  By then, the Nazi Party's 1933 rise to power in Germany had triggered flight of intellectuals. In exile in England, Otto Neurath died in 1945. Rudolf Carnap, Hans Reichenbach, and Carl Hempel—Carnap's protégé who had studied in Berlin with Reichenbach—settled permanently in America. Upon Germany's annexation of Austria in 1938, remaining logical positivists, many of whom were also Jewish, were targeted and continued flight.  Logical positivism thus became dominant in the English-speaking world.

Principles

Analytic/synthetic gap

Concerning reality, the necessary is a state true in all possible worlds—mere logical validity—whereas the contingent hinges on the way the particular world is.  Concerning knowledge, the a priori is knowable before or without, whereas the a posteriori is knowable only after or through, relevant experience.  Concerning statements, the analytic is true via terms' arrangement and meanings, thus a tautology—true by logical necessity but uninformative about the world—whereas the synthetic adds reference to a state of facts, a contingency.

In 1739, David Hume cast a fork aggressively dividing "relations of ideas" from "matters of fact and real existence", such that all truths are of one type or the other. By Hume's fork, truths by relations among ideas (abstract) all align on one side (analytic, necessary, a priori), whereas truths by states of actualities (concrete) always align on the other side (synthetic, contingent, a posteriori). Of any treatises containing neither, Hume orders, "Commit it then to the flames, for it can contain nothing but sophistry and illusion".

Thus awakened from "dogmatic slumber", Immanuel Kant quested to answer Hume's challenge—but by explaining how metaphysics is possible.  Eventually, in his 1781 work, Kant crossed the tines of Hume's fork to identify another range of truths by necessity—synthetic a priori, statements claiming states of facts but known true before experience—by arriving at transcendental idealism, attributing the mind a constructive role in phenomena by arranging sense data into the very experience space, time, and substance.  Thus, Kant saved Newton's law of universal gravitation from Hume's problem of induction by finding uniformity of nature to be a priori knowledge.  Logical positivists rejected Kant's synthetic a priori, and adopted Hume's fork, whereby a statement is either analytic and a priori (thus necessary and verifiable logically) or synthetic and a posteriori (thus contingent and verifiable empirically).

Observation/theory gap

Early, most logical positivists proposed that all knowledge is based on logical inference from simple "protocol sentences" grounded in observable facts.  In the 1936 and 1937 papers "Testability and meaning", individual terms replace sentences as the units of meaning. Further, theoretical terms no longer need to acquire meaning by explicit definition from observational terms: the connection may be indirect, through a system of implicit definitions. Carnap also provided an important, pioneering discussion of disposition predicates.

Cognitive meaningfulness

Verification

The logical positivists' initial stance was that a statement is "cognitively meaningful" in terms of conveying truth value, information or factual content only if some finite procedure conclusively determines its truth. By this verifiability principle, only statements verifiable either by their analyticity or by empiricism were cognitively meaningful.  Metaphysics, ontology, as well as much of ethics failed this criterion, and so were found cognitively meaningless.  Moritz Schlick, however, did not view ethical or aesthetic statements as cognitively meaningless.  Cognitive meaningfulness was variously defined: having a truth value; corresponding to a possible state of affairs; intelligible or understandable as are scientific statements.

Ethics and aesthetics were subjective preferences, while theology and other metaphysics contained "pseudostatements", neither true nor false.  This meaningfulness was cognitive, although other types of meaningfulness—for instance, emotive, expressive, or figurative—occurred in metaphysical discourse, dismissed from further review.  Thus, logical positivism indirectly asserted Hume's law, the principle that is statements cannot justify ought statements, but are separated by an unbridgeable gap.  A. J. Ayer's 1936 book asserted an extreme variant—the boo/hooray doctrine—whereby all evaluative judgments are but emotional reactions.

Confirmation

In an important pair of papers in 1936 and 1937, "Testability and meaning", Carnap replaced verification with confirmation, on the view that although universal laws cannot be verified they can be confirmed. Later, Carnap employed abundant logical and mathematical methods in researching inductive logic while seeking to provide an account of probability as "degree of confirmation", but was never able to formulate a model. In Carnap's inductive logic, every universal law's degree of confirmation is always zero. In any event, the precise formulation of what came to be called the "criterion of cognitive significance" took three decades (Hempel 1950, Carnap 1956, Carnap 1961).

Carl Hempel became a major critic within the logical positivism movement. Hempel criticized the positivist thesis that empirical knowledge is restricted to Basissätze/Beobachtungssätze/Protokollsätze (basic statements or observation statements or protocol statements). Hempel elucidated the paradox of confirmation.

Weak verification

The second edition of A. J. Ayer's book arrived in 1946, and discerned strong versus weak forms of verification.  Ayer concluded, "A proposition is said to be verifiable, in the strong sense of the term, if, and only if, its truth could be conclusively established by experience", but is verifiable in the weak sense "if it is possible for experience to render it probable". And yet, "no proposition, other than a tautology, can possibly be anything more than a probable hypothesis". Thus, all are open to weak verification.

Philosophy of science

Upon the global defeat of Nazism, and the removal from philosophy of rivals for radical reform—Marburg neo-Kantianism, Husserlian phenomenology, Heidegger's "existential hermeneutics"—and while hosted in the climate of American pragmatism and commonsense empiricism, the neopositivists shed much of their earlier, revolutionary zeal.  No longer crusading to revise traditional philosophy into a new scientific philosophy, they became respectable members of a new philosophy subdiscipline, philosophy of science.  Receiving support from Ernest Nagel, logical empiricists were especially influential in the social sciences.

Explanation

Comtean positivism had viewed science as description, whereas the logical positivists posed science as explanation, perhaps to better realize the envisioned unity of science by covering not only fundamental science—that is, fundamental physics—but the special sciences, too, for instance biology, anthropology, psychology, sociology, and economics. The most widely accepted concept of scientific explanation, held even by neopositivist critic Karl Popper, was the deductive-nomological model (DN model). Yet DN model received its greatest explication by Carl Hempel, first in his 1942 article "The function of general laws in history", and more explicitly with Paul Oppenheim in their 1948 article "Studies in the logic of explanation".

In the DN model, the stated phenomenon to be explained is the explanandum—which can be an event, law, or theory—whereas premises stated to explain it are the explanans.  Explanans must be true or highly confirmed, contain at least one law, and entail the explanandum.   Thus, given initial conditions C1, C2 . . . Cn plus general laws L1, L2 . . . Ln, event E is a deductive consequence and scientifically explained.  In the DN model, a law is an unrestricted generalization by conditional proposition—If A, then B—and has empirical content testable.  (Differing from a merely true regularity—for instance, George always carries only $1 bills in his wallet—a law suggests what must be true, and is consequent of a scientific theory's axiomatic structure.)

By the Humean empiricist view that humans observe sequences of events, (not cause and effect, as causality and causal mechanisms are unobservable), the DN model neglects causality beyond mere constant conjunction, first event A and then always event B.  Hempel's explication of the DN model held natural laws—empirically confirmed regularities—as satisfactory and, if formulated realistically, approximating causal explanation.  In later articles, Hempel defended the DN model and proposed a probabilistic explanation, inductive-statistical model (IS model). the DN and IS models together form the covering law model, as named by a critic, William Dray.  Derivation of statistical laws from other statistical laws goes to deductive-statistical model (DS model).  Georg Henrik von Wright, another critic, named it subsumption theory, fitting the ambition of theory reduction.

Unity of science

Logical positivists were generally committed to "Unified Science", and sought a common language or, in Neurath's phrase, a "universal slang" whereby all scientific propositions could be expressed. The adequacy of proposals or fragments of proposals for such a language was often asserted on the basis of various "reductions" or "explications" of the terms of one special science to the terms of another, putatively more fundamental. Sometimes these reductions consisted of set-theoretic manipulations of a few logically primitive concepts (as in Carnap's Logical Structure of the World, 1928).  Sometimes, these reductions consisted of allegedly analytic or a priori deductive relationships (as in Carnap's "Testability and meaning"). A number of publications over a period of thirty years would attempt to elucidate this concept.

Theory reduction

As in Comtean positivism's envisioned unity of science, neopositivists aimed to network all special sciences through the covering law model of scientific explanation.  And ultimately, by supplying boundary conditions and supplying bridge laws within the covering law model, all the special sciences' laws would reduce to fundamental physics, the fundamental science.

Critics

After World War II, key tenets of logical positivism, including its atomistic philosophy of science, the verifiability principle, and the fact/value gap, drew escalated criticism. The verifiability criterion made universal statements 'cognitively' meaningless, and even made statements beyond empiricism for technological but not conceptual reasons meaningless, which was taken to pose significant problems for the philosophy of science. These problems were recognized within the movement, which hosted attempted solutions—Carnap's move to confirmation, Ayer's acceptance of weak verification—but the program drew sustained criticism from a number of directions by the 1950s. Even philosophers disagreeing among themselves on which direction general epistemology ought to take, as well as on philosophy of science, agreed that the logical empiricist program was untenable, and it became viewed as self-contradictory: the verifiability criterion of meaning was itself unverified.  Notable critics included  Popper, Quine, Hanson, Kuhn, Putnam, Austin, Strawson, Goodman,  and Rorty.

Popper
An early, tenacious critic was Karl Popper whose 1934 book Logik der Forschung, arriving in English in 1959 as The Logic of Scientific Discovery, directly answered verificationism. Popper considered the problem of induction as rendering empirical verification logically impossible, and the deductive fallacy of affirming the consequent reveals any phenomenon's capacity to host more than one logically possible explanation.  Accepting scientific method as hypotheticodeduction, whose inference form is denying the consequent, Popper finds scientific method unable to proceed without falsifiable predictions. Popper thus identifies falsifiability to demarcate not meaningful from meaningless but simply scientific from  unscientific—a label not in itself unfavorable.

Popper finds virtue in metaphysics, required to develop new scientific theories. And an unfalsifiable—thus unscientific, perhaps metaphysical—concept in one era can later, through evolving knowledge or technology, become falsifiable, thus scientific.  Popper also found science's quest for truth to rest on values. Popper disparages the pseudoscientific, which occurs when an unscientific theory is proclaimed true and coupled with seemingly scientific method by "testing" the unfalsifiable theory—whose predictions are confirmed by necessity—or when a scientific theory's falsifiable predictions are strongly falsified but the theory is persistently protected by "immunizing stratagems", such as the appendage of ad hoc clauses saving the theory or the recourse to increasingly speculative hypotheses shielding the theory.

Explicitly denying the positivist view of meaning and verification, Popper developed the epistemology of critical rationalism, which considers that human knowledge evolves by conjectures and refutations, and that no number, degree, and variety of empirical successes can either verify or confirm scientific theory. For Popper, science's aim is corroboration of scientific theory, which strives for scientific realism but accepts the maximal status of strongly corroborated verisimilitude ("truthlikeness"). Popper thus acknowledged the value of the positivist movement's emphasis on science but claimed that he had "killed positivism".

Quine

Although an empiricist, American logician Willard Van Orman Quine published the 1951 paper "Two Dogmas of Empiricism", which challenged conventional empiricist presumptions.  Quine attacked the analytic/synthetic division, which the verificationist program had been hinged upon in order to entail, by consequence of Hume's fork, both necessity and aprioricity. Quine's ontological relativity explained that every term in any statement has its meaning contingent on a vast network of knowledge and belief, the speaker's conception of the entire world. Quine later proposed naturalized epistemology.

Hanson

In 1958, Norwood Hanson's Patterns of Discovery undermined the division of observation versus theory, as one can predict, collect, prioritize, and assess data only via some horizon of expectation set by a theory.  Thus, any dataset—the direct observations, the scientific facts—is laden with theory.

Kuhn

With his landmark The Structure of Scientific Revolutions (1962), Thomas Kuhn critically destabilized the verificationist program, which was presumed to call for foundationalism. (But already in the 1930s, Otto Neurath had argued for nonfoundationalism via coherentism by likening science to a boat (Neurath's boat) that scientists must rebuild at sea.) Although Kuhn's thesis itself was attacked even by opponents of neopositivism, in the 1970 postscript to Structure, Kuhn asserted, at least, that there was no algorithm to science—and, on that, even most of Kuhn's critics agreed.

Powerful and persuasive, Kuhn's book, unlike the vocabulary and symbols of logic's formal language, was written in natural language open to the layperson. Kuhn's book was first published in a volume of International Encyclopedia of Unified Science—a project begun by logical positivists but co-edited by Neurath whose view of science was already nonfoundationalist as mentioned above—and some sense unified science, indeed, but by bringing it into the realm of historical and social assessment, rather than fitting it to the model of physics. Kuhn's ideas were rapidly adopted by scholars in disciplines well outside natural sciences, and, as logical empiricists were extremely influential in the social sciences, ushered academia into postpositivism or postempiricism.

Putnam

The "received view" operates on the correspondence rule that states, "The observational terms are taken as referring to specified phenomena or phenomenal properties, and the only interpretation given to the theoretical terms is their explicit definition provided by the correspondence rules". According to Hilary Putnam, a former student of Reichenbach and of Carnap, the dichotomy of observational terms versus theoretical terms introduced a problem within scientific discussion that was nonexistent until this dichotomy was stated by logical positivists. Putnam's four objections:

 Something is referred to as "observational" if it is observable directly with our senses. Then an observational term cannot be applied to something unobservable. If this is the case, there are no observational terms.
 With Carnap's classification, some unobservable terms are not even theoretical and belong to neither observational terms nor theoretical terms. Some theoretical terms refer primarily to observational terms.
 Reports of observational terms frequently contain theoretical terms.
 A scientific theory may not contain any theoretical terms (an example of this is Darwin's original theory of evolution).

Putnam also alleged that positivism was actually a form of metaphysical idealism by its rejecting scientific theory's ability to garner knowledge about nature's unobservable aspects.  With his "no miracles" argument, posed in 1974, Putnam asserted scientific realism, the stance that science achieves true—or approximately true—knowledge of the world as it exists independently of humans' sensory experience. In this, Putnam opposed not only the positivism but other instrumentalism—whereby scientific theory is but a human tool to predict human observations—filling the void left by positivism's decline.

Decline and legacy

By the late 1960s, logical positivism had become exhausted. In 1976, A. J. Ayer quipped that "the most important" defect of logical positivism "was that nearly all of it was false", though he maintained "it was true in spirit." Although logical positivism tends to be recalled as a pillar of scientism, Carl Hempel was key in establishing the philosophy subdiscipline philosophy of science where Thomas Kuhn and Karl Popper brought in the era of postpositivism. John Passmore found logical positivism to be "dead, or as dead as a philosophical movement ever becomes".

Logical positivism's fall reopened debate over the metaphysical merit of scientific theory, whether it can offer knowledge of the world beyond human experience (scientific realism) versus whether it is but a human tool to predict human experience (instrumentalism). Meanwhile, it became popular among philosophers to rehash the faults and failures of logical positivism without investigation of them. Thereby, logical positivism has been generally misrepresented, sometimes severely. Arguing for their own views, often framed versus logical positivism, many philosophers have reduced logical positivism to simplisms and stereotypes, especially the notion of logical positivism as a type of foundationalism. In any event, the movement helped anchor analytic philosophy in the English-speaking world, and returned Britain to empiricism.  Without the logical positivists, who have been tremendously influential outside philosophy, especially in psychology and other social sciences, intellectual life of the 20th century would be unrecognizable.

See also

Anti-realism
Definitions of philosophy
Empirio-criticism
Moral panic
Raven paradox
Sociological positivism
The Structure of Science
Unobservable

People
Gustav Bergmann
Herbert Feigl
Kurt Grelling
Friedrich Waismann
R. B. Braithwaite

Notes

References
Bechtel, William, Philosophy of Science: An Overview for Cognitive Science (Hillsdale NJ: Lawrence Erlbaum Assoc, 1988).
Friedman, Michael, Reconsidering Logical Positivism (New York: Cambridge University Press, 1999).
Novick, Peter,  That Noble Dream: The 'Objectivity Question' and the American Historical Profession (Cambridge UK: Cambridge University Press, 1988).
Stahl, William A  & Robert A Campbell, Yvonne Petry, Gary Diver, Webs of Reality: Social Perspectives on Science and Religion (Piscataway NJ: Rutgers University Press, 2002).
Suppe, Frederick, ed, The Structure of Scientific Theories, 2nd edn (Urbana IL: University of Illinois Press, 1977).

Further reading

Achinstein, Peter and Barker, Stephen F. The Legacy of Logical Positivism: Studies in the Philosophy of Science. Baltimore: Johns Hopkins Press, 1969.
Ayer, Alfred Jules. Logical Positivism. Glencoe, Ill: Free Press, 1959.
Barone, Francesco. Il neopositivismo logico. Roma Bari: Laterza, 1986.
Bergmann, Gustav. The Metaphysics of Logical Positivism. New York: Longmans Green, 1954.
Cirera, Ramon.  Carnap and the Vienna Circle: Empiricism and Logical Syntax. Atlanta, GA: Rodopi, 1994.
Edmonds, David & Eidinow, John; Wittgenstein's Poker, 
Friedman, Michael. Reconsidering Logical Positivism. Cambridge, UK: Cambridge University Press, 1999
Gadol, Eugene T. Rationality and Science: A Memorial Volume for Moritz Schlick in Celebration of the Centennial of his Birth. Wien: Springer, 1982.
Geymonat, Ludovico. La nuova filosofia della natura in Germania. Torino, 1934.
Giere, Ronald N. and Richardson, Alan W. Origins of Logical Empiricism. Minneapolis: University of Minnesota Press, 1997.
Hanfling, Oswald. Logical Positivism. Oxford: B. Blackwell, 1981.
Holt, Jim, "Positive Thinking" (review of Karl Sigmund, Exact Thinking in Demented Times:  The Vienna Circle and the Epic Quest for the Foundations of Science, Basic Books, 449 pp.), The New York Review of Books, vol. LXIV, no. 20 (21 December 2017), pp. 74–76.
Jangam, R. T. Logical Positivism and Politics. Delhi: Sterling Publishers, 1970.
Janik, Allan and Toulmin, Stephen. Wittgenstein's Vienna. London: Weidenfeld and Nicolson, 1973.
Kraft, Victor. The Vienna Circle: The Origin of Neo-positivism, a Chapter in the History of Recent Philosophy. New York: Greenwood Press, 1953.
McGuinness, Brian. Wittgenstein and the Vienna Circle: Conversations Recorded by Friedrich Waismann. Trans. by Joachim Schulte and Brian McGuinness. New York: Barnes & Noble Books, 1979.
 Milkov, Nikolay (ed.). Die Berliner Gruppe. Texte zum Logischen Empirismus von Walter Dubislav, Kurt Grelling, Carl G. Hempel, Alexander Herzberg, Kurt Lewin, Paul Oppenheim und Hans Reichenbach. Hamburg: Meiner 2015. (German)
Mises von, Richard. Positivism: A Study in Human Understanding. Cambridge: Harvard University Press, 1951.
Parrini, Paolo. Empirismo logico e convenzionalismo: saggio di storia della filosofia della scienza. Milano: F. Angeli, 1983.
Parrini, Paolo; Salmon, Wesley C.; Salmon, Merrilee H. (ed.) Logical Empiricism – Historical and Contemporary Perspectives, Pittsburgh: University of Pittsburgh Press, 2003.
Reisch, George. How the Cold War Transformed Philosophy of Science : To the Icy Slopes of Logic. New York: Cambridge University Press, 2005.
Rescher, Nicholas. The Heritage of Logical Positivism. Lanham, MD: University Press of America, 1985.
Richardson, Alan and Thomas Uebel (eds.) The Cambridge Companion to Logical Positivism. New York: Cambridge University Press, 2007.
Salmon, Wesley and Wolters, Gereon (ed.) Logic, Language, and the Structure of Scientific Theories: Proceedings of the Carnap-Reichenbach Centennial, University of Konstanz, 21–24 May 1991, Pittsburgh: University of Pittsburgh Press, 1994.
Sarkar, Sahotra (ed.) The Emergence of Logical Empiricism: From 1900 to the Vienna Circle. New York: Garland Publishing, 1996.
Sarkar, Sahotra (ed.) Logical Empiricism at its Peak: Schlick, Carnap, and Neurath. New York: Garland Pub., 1996.
Sarkar, Sahotra (ed.) Logical Empiricism and the Special Sciences: Reichenbach, Feigl, and Nagel. New York: Garland Pub., 1996.
Sarkar, Sahotra (ed.) Decline and Obsolescence of Logical Empiricism: Carnap vs. Quine and the Critics. New York: Garland Pub., 1996.
Sarkar, Sahotra (ed.) The Legacy of the Vienna Circle: Modern Reappraisals. New York: Garland Pub., 1996.
Spohn, Wolfgang (ed.) Erkenntnis Orientated: A Centennial Volume for Rudolf Carnap and Hans Reichenbach, Boston: Kluwer Academic Publishers, 1991.
Stadler, Friedrich. The Vienna Circle. Studies in the Origins, Development, and Influence of Logical Empiricism. New York: Springer, 2001. – 2nd Edition: Dordrecht: Springer, 2015.
Stadler, Friedrich (ed.). The Vienna Circle and Logical Empiricism. Re-evaluation and Future Perspectives. Dordrecht – Boston – London, Kluwer 2003.

External links

Articles by logical positivists
 The Scientific Conception of the World: The Vienna Circle
 Carnap, Rudolf. 'The Elimination of Metaphysics Through Logical Analysis of Language'
 Carnap, Rudolf. 'Empiricism, Semantics, and Ontology.'
 Excerpt from Carnap, Rudolf. Philosophy and Logical Syntax.
 Feigl, Herbert. 'Positivism in the Twentieth Century (Logical Empiricism)', Dictionary of the History of Ideas, 1974, Gale Group (Electronic Edition)
 Hempel, Carl. 'Problems and Changes in the Empiricist Criterion of Meaning.'

Articles on logical positivism
 
 Kemerling, Garth. 'Logical Positivism', Philosophy Pages
 Murzi, Mauro. 'Logical Positivism', The New Encyclopedia of Unbelief, Tom Flynn (ed.). Prometheus Books, 2007 (PDF version)
 Murzi, Mauro. 'The Philosophy of Logical Positivism.'
 Passmore, John. 'Logical Positivism', The Encyclopedia of Philosophy, Paul Edwards (ed.). New York: Macmillan, 1967, first edition

Articles on related philosophical topics
 Hájek, Alan. 'Interpretations of Probability', The Stanford Encyclopedia of Philosophy (Summer 2003 Edition), Edward N. Zalta (ed.)
 Rey, Georges. 'The Analytic/Synthetic Distinction', The Stanford Encyclopedia of Philosophy (Fall 2003 Edition), Edward N. Zalta (ed.)
 Ryckman, Thomas A., 'Early Philosophical Interpretations of General Relativity', The Stanford Encyclopedia of Philosophy (Winter 2001 Edition), Edward N. Zalta (ed.)
 Woleński, Jan. 'Lvov-Warsaw School', The Stanford Encyclopedia of Philosophy (Summer 2003 Edition), Edward N. Zalta (ed.)
 Woodward, James. 'Scientific Explanation', The Stanford Encyclopedia of Philosophy (Summer 2003 Edition), Edward N. Zalta (ed.)

 
Analytic philosophy
Empiricism
Epistemological theories
Epistemology of science
History of science
Linguistic turn
Meaning in religious language
Philosophical schools and traditions
Philosophy of science
Positivism
Theories of language
Western philosophy